"Lonely People" is a song by the band America from the album Holiday. The term may also refer to:
Lonely People, an album and its title track by Orla Gartland
"Neon (Lonely People)", a song by Lena Meyer-Landrut from the album Stardust
"Lonely People", a song by Demi Lovato from the album Dancing with the Devil... the Art of Starting Over
"Lonely People", a song by Gotthard from the album Homerun
"The Lonely People", a song by Void of Vision